Dongduk Women's University (DWU) is a private university in Seoul, South Korea.

Dongduk Women's University is originated from Dongwon Girls School, founded in 1950. DWU is composed of eight colleges, six departments, 18 majors, 16 departments of majors, and seven graduate schools. It has about 7,500 students and 350 faculty members.

Facilities include its Design Research Center in Chungdam, Performing Art Center in Daehangno, and  Dongduk Art Gallery in Insadong.

Academics
Undergraduate offerings at Dongduk Women's University are divided among the Division of Humanities and the university's eight colleges:  the College of Humanities (which includes foreign-language courses), College of Social Science, College of Natural Science, College of Computer and Information Science, College of Pharmacy, College of Arts, College of Design, and College of Performance Arts.

Graduate offerings are divided between the general graduate school and several specialized graduate schools:  Fashion, Information Science, Women's Development, Education, Performance Arts, and Obesity Research.

History
Dongduk Women's University was established as Dongduk Women's College (동덕여자대학), a four-year institution, in 1950.  It moved to its present location in 1967.  The college received permission to open a graduate school in 1980 and gained the status of a university in 1987.  The most recent academic reorganization, resulting in the current structure, took place in 2003.
1900s
 1950 Founded Dongduk Women's College (DWC)
 1952 Dr. Cho, Dong-Shik as the First President of Dongduk Women's College
 1960 Lee, Kyung-Se as the Chairman of the Board of DWC
 1961 Dr. Cho, Young-Wook as the Second President of DWC
 1963 Dr. Cho, Dong-Shik as the Chairman of the Board of DWC
 1967 Moved to current campus in Wolgok-dong, Seoul
 1970 Dr. Lee, Neung-Woo as Chairman of the Board
 1976 Dr. Cho, Young-Gak as Chairman of the Board
 1980 Established Dongduk Women's Graduate School
 1981 Dr. Jung, Hae-Dong as Third President
 1983 Dr. Kim, Jong-Hyub as President
 1987 Accredited as a University with four colleges (Humanities, Social Science, Natural Science, and Arts & Physical Education)
 1988 Dr. Kim, Jong-Hyub as First President of Dongduk Women's University and Dr. Cho, Won-Young as Vice President
 1995 Opened Korea's First Women's Studies Library on campus
 1996 Dr. Cho, Won-Young as Third President of DWU; moved College of Design & Graduate School of Design to Design Research Center Building in Chungdam-dong
 1997 Established DWU Library Information Network System (DULINET)
 1997 Opened two new buildings on Main Campus: Soonginkwan & Women's Studies Center
 1998 Concluded cooperative agreement with Open Cyber University (OCU)
 1998 Opened Dongduk Student Service Center
 1999 Opened The Art Center (Yesoolkwan)
 1999 Ms. Lee, Eun-Joo as Chairwoman of the Board of Trustees
  2000s
 2000 Opened the Yuldong Memorial Music Hall
 2001 Opened the Performing Arts Center
 2003 Dr. Song, Suk-Goo as fifth President of DWU
 2004 Dr. Park, Sang-Gi as Chairman of the Board of Trustees
 2004 Dr. Son, Bong-Ho as sixth President of DWU
 2005 Signed MOU with California State University, Sacramento (U.S.A.), Ochanomizu University (Japan)
 2005 Signed MOU with Ministry of Employment and Labor (Seoul)
 2005 Signed MOU with Zhejiang (浙江大學) University (China), opened Center for Teaching & Learning, accredited Department of Beauty Enhancement in Graduate School
 2006 Opened the Art and Craft Institute
 2006 Signed MOU with Meiji University (Japan), opened Division of Family & Child Studies and Department of Model Major, renaming the Social Education Center for Women to the Dongduk Women's Continuing Education Center
 2006. 09 Signed MOU with Lueneburg University (Germany), opened co-department of Korean Language Education and Creative Writing in Graduate School, opened Graduate School of Obesity, Beauty & Health Science, Graduate School of International Culture, Dr. Hong, Seong-Am as Acting President
 2007 Signed MOU with Siegen University (Germany) and University of Valenciennes and Hainaut-Cambresis (France)
 2007 Signed MOU with Paul Verlaine University – Metz (France) and Northumbria University (U.K.)
 2008 Signed MOU with Friedrich-Schiller Universitat Jena (Germany)
 2008 Dr. Kim, Un-Bae as Acting President
 2010 Dr. Maeng, Won-Jai as the foundation chairman of the board of the trustees
 2010 Dr. Kim, Yoon-Sik as acting president
 2011 Dr. Kim, Young Rae as the seventh president

Colleges and departments
There are nine colleges and 30 departments:
 College of Humanities - Humanities, English, Japanese, French, German, Chinese
 College of Social Sciences - Business Administration, Economics, International Business, Library and Information Science, Social Welfare, Child Development and Education
 College of Natural Sciences - Food and Nutrition, Health Sciences, Physical Education, Applied Chemistry
 College of Information Science - Computer Science, Statistics and Information Science
 College of Pharmacy - Pharmacy
 College of Arts - Painting, Digital Craft Arts, Curatorial Studies and Art Management, Piano, Orchestral Instruments, Vocal music
 College of Design - Design
 College of Performance Arts - Dance, Media Arts and Entertainment, Applied Music, Modeling
 College of Liberal Arts and Teaching Profession

Seven Graduate Schools:
 General Graduate School
 Graduate School of Fashion Design
 Graduate School of Design
 Graduate School of Education
 Graduate School of Performing Arts
 Graduate School of Obesity, Beauty and Health Sciences
 Graduate School of International Culture

Notable alumni

See also
List of universities and colleges in South Korea
Education in South Korea

References

External links
Official school website, in English and in Korean

Universities and colleges in Seoul
Women's universities and colleges in South Korea
Educational institutions established in 1950
1950 establishments in South Korea
Seongbuk District